Amy-Leigh Hickman (born 16 September 1997) is an English actress. Hickman made her television debut as Carmen Howle in the CBBC series Tracy Beaker Returns, a role she reprised in the sequel series The Dumping Ground. She then went onto appear as Linzi Bragg in the BBC soap opera EastEnders, before being cast as Nasreen Paracha in the Channel 4 drama Ackley Bridge, a role for which she won the Actor award for at the RTS Yorkshire Awards. Her other roles include Ester Kamali in Strike Back (2013), Sia Marshall in Safe (2018), Mimi Saunders in Our Girl (2020) and Bethany in Innocent (2021). Hickman also stars in the fourth series of the Netflix drama You (2023).

Early life
Hickman was born on 16 September 1997, to parents of Anglo-Indian heritage and was brought up in Hastings, East Sussex, where she attended The St Leonards Academy. When she was five, she began studying acting at The Theatre Workshop in Bexhill.

Career
Hickman's casting in Tracy Beaker Returns, a spin off from The Story of Tracy Beaker was announced in December 2008. Hickman reprised her role of Carmen Howle in The Dumping Ground, a sequel to Tracy Beaker Returns. In 2013, Hickman appeared in 6 episodes of Sky One's Strike Back as Ester. In 2015, Hickman appeared in BBC daytime soap opera, Doctors as Sara Boswell and in Casualty as Aisha Karim. She played the role of Carmen Howle in another The Dumping Ground spin-off, The Dumping Ground: I'm..., a webisode series. In 2014, Hickman played Princess Jasmine in her management's version of Aladdin, which took place in Swansea, Wales. Hickman starred in another of her management's pantomimes in late 2015, this time in Sleeping Beauty, playing the role of Jill, alongside her Tracy Beaker Returns co-star Joe Maw who played the corresponding Jack. In 2016, she appeared in Sleeping Beauty at the Sunderland Empire Theatre, where she played the role of Princess Briar Rose. Later that year, Hickman worked with Nationwide Education on the web series Get Real With Money, aimed at young people with the objective of educating them about money management and finances.

Hickman then appeared as a recurring character in the BBC soap opera EastEnders as Linzi Bragg, a love interest for Jay Brown (Jamie Borthwick), from February until April 2016 and returned for a short stint in March 2017. From 2017 to 2019, Hickman portrayed Nasreen Paracha in Channel 4 school drama Ackley Bridge. In 2018, Hickman appeared in the Netflix original series Safe as Sia Marshall. Also in 2018, Hickman played Leah in a stage production titled Beautiful Thing by the Tobacco Factory Theatre. In July 2019, she starred in the BBC Three special The Left Behind, as Yasmin. In 2020, she starred in the fourth series of the BBC drama Our Girl as Mimi Saunders. Later that year, it was announced that Hickman would be starring in the second series of the ITV crime drama series Innocent, which aired in May 2021. Later in 2021, she co-starred in the short film True Colours alongside Tilly Keeper. She then starred in a revival of the play East is East alongside Ackley Bridge co-stars Tony Jayawardena and Gurjeet Singh at the Birmingham Repertory Theatre. In April 2022, it was announced that Hickman had been cast in the fourth series of the Netflix drama series You.

Filmography

Television and film

Voice roles

Stage

Awards and nominations

References

External links
 

1997 births
21st-century English actresses
Actresses from Sussex
English child actresses
English television actresses
English soap opera actresses
Living people
People from Hastings
Anglo-Indian people
British actresses of Indian descent